Jackie Cox may refer to:

Jackie Cox (footballer) (1911–1990), Scottish football player and manager
Jackie Cox (drag queen), the stage name of Darius Rose, an Iranian-Canadian drag queen

See also
Jack Cox (disambiguation)